The Cabinet of Khyber Pakhtunkhwa is a formal body composed of senior government officials chosen and led by the Chief Minister of Khyber Pakhtunkhwa to run the Government of Khyber Pakhtunkhwa province of Pakistan. All cabinet members sworn in are designated Provincial Minister, and are seated in Peshawar, the provincial capital.

According to the Constitution of Pakistan, the Chief Minister may dismiss members of the cabinet, but must do so in writing, and new appointees must again be approved by the Provincial Assembly of Khyber Pakhtunkhwa. As of January 2023, Caretaker government is installed in the province, until elections in April.

Last Cabinet

References

http://www.pakp.gov.pk/2013/cabinet-composition/

Khyber Pakhtunkhwa ministries
Cabinets established in 2013
Cabinets disestablished in 2018